This is a list of sports venues in Karachi, the capital of Sindh province in Pakistan.

Cricket

International stadiums 
 National Stadium
 Southend Club Cricket Stadium a.k.a. Defence Cricket Stadium

Domestic and first-class cricket grounds 

 Al Nadil Burhani Sports Complex
 Aga Khan Gymkhana Ground
 Asghar Ali Shah Cricket Stadium
 Asifabad Sports Ground
 B.V.S. Parsi School Ground
 Bakhtiari Youth Centre
 Bohra Gymkhana Ground
 Karachi City C.A. Stadium (KCCA Stadium)
 Karachi Development Authority Sports Ground
 Karachi Goan Association Ground
 Karachi Gymkhana Ground
 Karachi Parsi Institute Ground
 Landhi Gymkhana Ground
 Modern Cricket Club Zone III Regd
 National Bank of Pakistan Sports Complex
 Pakistan Air Force Faisal Base Sports Ground
 Pak Star Ground, Malir
 PCB Academy Ground
 Quaid-e-Azam Park
 RLCA (Sir, Rashid Latif Cricket Academy) I, II, III
 Steel Mills Ground
 Students Sports Ground
 TMC Cricket Ground
 United Bank Limited Sports Complex
 Young Fighter Cricket Ground
 Shadab cricket stadium (Orangi Town)
 Hill Park Cricket Ground
 PNS Karsaz Cricket Ground (Karsaz Road)
 KDA Cricket Ground (Near Interboard)
 SKBZ Cricket Ground (DHA)

Football 

 Al Nadil Burhani Sports Complex
 Peoples Football Stadium
 KMC Football Stadium (Formerly known as the CDGK Stadium)
 Karachi United Stadium
 Drigh Road Union Football Stadium
 Karachi Port Trust Stadium
 National Coaching Centre (NCC) also known as PSB Coastguards Ground
 Aga Khan Sports Club Football Ground
 NSA Paposh also known as Pakwonders Ground
 Noor Ground, P.E.C.H.S Blk2
 16 Star Ground
 Shaeed-e-Inqalab Ground
 Baloch Mujahid Ground
 Shadab Ground FB Area
 Korangi Baloch Stadium Sharafi
 North Youngers Football Club, Block "L", North Nazimabad
 Jahangir Memorial Football Stadium

Hockey 
 Hockey Club of Pakistan
 Olympian Iftikhar Syed Park

Squash 
 KMC Sports Complex (Kashmir Road)
 Roshan Khan Jehangir Khan Squash Complex (Saddar adjacent Fleet Club/Lucky Star)
 National Bank of Pakistan Sports Complex
 Sindh Sports Complex Nazimabad

Golf 
 Arabian Sea Country Club
 Karachi Golf Club
 DHA Golf Course
 PNS Karsaz Golf Course 
 Airmen

Ice rink 
 Arena's Ice-skating Rink

See also
Sport in Pakistan
List of sports venues in Pakistan
 List of stadiums in Pakistan
 List of cricket grounds in Pakistan
 List of sports venues in Faisalabad
 List of sports venues in Lahore

External links 
 Cricket Grounds in Karachi - Cricinfo.com

Sports venues
Karachi
Karachi